Thomas Henry Skinner (born February 1991) is an English businessman and television personality from London. He rose to fame appearing in series 15 of The Apprentice, where he was fired by Alan Sugar in week 9. Known for his strong Cockney accent and "bosh" catchphrase, he has since appeared on other shows including 8 Out of 10 Cats and Celebrity MasterChef. He has also become known for posting his large and unusual breakfasts at Dino's Cafe in New Spitalfields Market on Twitter.

Life and career 

Skinner was born in Romford. He worked as a market trader from the age of 16.

At the time of his appearance on The Apprentice, Skinner was the owner of The Fluffy Pillow Company, selling beds, mattresses and a memory foam pillow of his own design.

In 2020, during the COVID-19 pandemic, after the owner of company's pillow manufacturer died of COVID-19, Skinner set up Bosh Beds, specialising in mattresses.
Skinner supports West Ham United FC

Post-Apprentice 

In 2020, Skinner appeared in series 15 of Celebrity MasterChef.

Skinner has become known for the videos he posts on Twitter, particularly those showing his large and unusual breakfasts, such as Christmas dinner and lasagne, usually eaten at Dino's Cafe on New Spitalfields Market and always ending with his catchphrase "bosh".

On 12 January 2023, Skinner released a song and accompanying music video titled "BOSH", in collaboration with Essex band Death of Guitar Pop.

Filmography

Personal life 

Skinner supports West Ham United F.C. He married his partner Sinéad in May 2022. They had their first child in October 2020. Skinner is also friends with Rylan.

References

External links
 

The Apprentice (British TV series) candidates
Living people
1991 births